Wejinabikun Lake is a lake in the Lake Superior drainage basin in Algoma District, Ontario, Canada. The primary inflow and outflow is the Magpie River, which flows downstream into North Wejinabikun Lake, and eventually into Lake Superior.

See also
List of lakes in Ontario

References

Lakes of Algoma District